The 1939 Winnipeg Blue Bombers finished in 1st place in the WIFU with a 10–2 record. The Blue Bombers won their second Grey Cup championship by defeating the Ottawa Rough Riders 8–7.

Regular season

Standings

Schedule

Playoffs

Grey Cup

References

Winnipeg Blue Bombers seasons
Grey Cup championship seasons